More Miles Per Hour was the fourth solo album released by John Miles in 1979. As with Zaragon, the album didn't manage to crack the top 40 in the U.K and the singles from the album failed to chart. 
For this album, Miles reunited with producer Alan Parsons and orchestral arranger Andrew Powell, with whom he also collaborated on Rebel.
For the first time, Miles played some of tracks ("Can't Keep a Good Man Down" and "We All Fall Down") before the album was released at the Great British Music Festival in Wembley in December 1978.
For the cover, Miles wanted a picture of himself as a pilot in front of a Concorde, but British Airports in London denied permission so Miles had to fly to New York to do the shoot.

In 2008, the album was reissued with new liner notes and bonus tracks.

Track listing

All Tracks written by Bob Marshall and John Miles
"Satisfied" 3:59
"It's Not Called Angel" 5:08
"Bad Blood" 4:16
"Fella in the Cellar" 6:43
"Can't Keep a Good Man Down" 3:48
"Oh Dear!" 4:10
"C'est La Vie" 4:27
"We All Fall Down" 6:57

Bonus tracks on 2008 reissue:

"Sweet Lorraine" (non album B-side of "Can't Keep a Good Man Down") – 3:02 
"Don't Give Me Your Sympathy" (non album A-side) – 2:49 
"If I Don't Need Loving" (non album B-side of "Don't Give Me Your Sympathy") – 4:44

Personnel
John Miles - lead vocals, keyboards, guitar
Bob Marshall - bass
Barry Black - drums
Brian Chatton - keyboards
Andrew Powell - orchestral arrangements

References

1979 albums
John Miles (musician) albums
Albums produced by Alan Parsons
Decca Records albums